John Connelly was an English professional footballer who played as an inside left.

Career
Born in Cleckheaton, Connelly played for Bradford City between December 1910 and 1911, making 1 appearance in the Football League for them.

Sources

References

Year of birth missing
Year of death missing
English footballers
Bradford City A.F.C. players
English Football League players
Association football inside forwards
People from Cleckheaton
Footballers from Yorkshire